Dewsbury railway station serves the town of Dewsbury in West Yorkshire, England.

The station is now managed by TransPennine Express, who provide trains to Leeds, Huddersfield, Manchester, York, Hull and Redcar Central.

Northern Trains also serve the station with trains on the Calder Valley line.

History

The line between Leeds and Ravensthorpe was built by the Leeds, Dewsbury and Manchester Railway, which was absorbed by the London and North Western Railway prior to opening. Dewsbury railway station was opened on 18 September 1848 and was subsequently named Dewsbury Wellington Road from 2 June 1924 until 20 February 1969, when it reverted to the original name.

Dewsbury was also served by three other stations which have since closed:
 Dewsbury Market Place, built by the Manchester and Leeds Railway, closed in 1930.
 Thornhill, also built by the Manchester and Leeds Railway, closed in 1961.

No trace of Market Place station remains, but the façade of Dewsbury Central was incorporated into a bridge supporting the Dewsbury Ring Road in 1985.

Facilities
The station is staffed through the day, with the ticket office on Platform 1. Self-service ticket machines are also provided in the booking hall.

There are waiting rooms on each platform, along with digital display screens, customer help points, timetable poster boards and automated announcements to offer train running information. There are no toilets. Lifts integrated into the footbridge provide step-free access to both platforms. The footbridge is also a public right of way.

On Platform 1, there is a piece of art called Horizons. The art club from Carlton Junior and Infant School "worked alongside artist Candida Wood from Can Do Art, and over 10 weeks they designed a piece of art aiming to attract members of the local community to visit the station".

Ticket barriers were installed in 2018.

In summer 2018, Kirklees Council started work on making improvements to the outside of the station. Plans included pedestrianizing the area directly outside the station and redesigning the car park entrances to improve traffic flow. The improvements are part of the "North Kirklees Growth Zone" initiative, intended to be a kick start to improvements to the town.

Services

As of December 2019, Dewsbury is served by four trains per hour to Leeds and four trains per hour to Manchester. The regular service pattern is as follows:

Eastbound (Towards Leeds)

Westbound (Towards Manchester)

On Sundays, the Northern Trains services do not run.

See also
Listed buildings in Dewsbury

References

External links

 West Riding Licensed Refreshment Rooms - Official Website

Railway stations in Kirklees
DfT Category D stations
Former London and North Western Railway stations
Railway stations in Great Britain opened in 1848
Railway stations served by TransPennine Express
Northern franchise railway stations
Buildings and structures in Dewsbury